WOW Christmas is the third installment in the WOW Christmas series. It was released on September 27, 2011.

Commercial performance
As of December 2012, the album has sold 127,000 copies.

Track listing

Note
Some songs listed were released as singles and then released on the albums listed after the release of WOW Christmas (2011).

Charts

References

2011 Christmas albums
Christmas compilation albums
2011 compilation albums
WOW series albums